A self-disorder, also called ipseity disturbance, is a psychological phenomenon of disruption or diminishing of a person's sense of minimal (or basic) self-awareness. The sense of minimal self refers to the very basic sense of having experiences that are one's own; it has no properties, unlike the more extended sense of self, the narrative self, which is characterized by the person's reflections on themselves as a person, things they like, their identity, and other aspects that are the result of reflection on one's self. Disturbances in the sense of minimal self, as measured by the Examination of Anomalous Self-Experience (EASE), aggregate in the schizophrenia spectrum disorders, to include schizotypal personality disorder, and distinguish them from other conditions such as psychotic bipolar disorder and borderline personality disorder.

Minimal self 
The minimal self has been likened to a "flame that enlightens its surroundings and thereby itself." Unlike the extended self, which is composed of properties such as the person's identity, the person's narrative, and other aspects that can be gleaned from reflection, the minimal self has no properties, but refers to the "mine-ness" "given-ness" of experience, that the experiences are that of the person having them in that person's stream of consciousness. These experiences that are part of the minimal self are normally "tacit" and implied, requiring no reflection on the part of the person experiencing to know that the experience is theirs. The minimal self cannot be further elaborated and normally one cannot grasp it upon reflection. The minimal self goes hand-in-hand with immersion in the shared social world, such that "[t]he world is always pregiven, ie, tacitly grasped as a self-evident background of all experiencing and meaning." This is the self-world structure.

De Warren gives an example of the minimal self combined with immersion in the shared social world: "When looking at this tree in my backyard, my consciousness is directed toward the tree and not toward my own act of perception. I am, however, aware of myself as perceiving this tree, yet this self-awareness (or self-consciousness) is not itself thematic." The focus is normally on the tree itself, not on the person's own act of seeing the tree: to know that one is seeing the tree does not require an act of reflection.

Disturbance 
In the schizophrenia spectrum disorders, the minimal self and the self-world structure are "constantly challenged, unstable, and oscillating," causing anomalous self-experiences known as self-disorders. These involve the person feeling as if they lack an identity, as if they are not really existing, that the sense of their experiences being their own (the "mine-ness" of their experiential world) is failing or diminishing, as if their inner experiences are no longer private, and that they don't really understand the world. These experiences lead to the person engaging in hyper-reflectivity, or abnormally prolonged and intense self-reflection, to attempt to gain a grasp on these experiences, but such intense reflection may further exacerbate the self-disorders. Self-disorders tend to be chronic, becoming incorporated into the person's way of being and affecting "how" they experience the world and not necessarily "what" they experience. This instability of the minimal self may provoke the onset of psychosis.

Similar phenomena can occur in other conditions, such as bipolar disorder and depersonalization disorder, but Sass's (2014) review of the literature comparing accounts of self-experience in various mental disorders shows that serious self-other confusion and "severe erosion of minimal self-experience" only occur in schizophrenia; as an example of the latter, Sass cites the autobiographical account of Elyn Saks, who has schizophrenia, of her experience of "disorganization" in which she felt that thoughts, perceptions, sensations, and even the passage of time became incoherent, and that she had no longer "the solid center from which one experiences reality", which occurred when she was 7 or 8 years old. This disturbance tends to fluctuate over time based on emotions and motivation, accounting for the phenomenon of dialipsis in schizophrenia, where neurocognitive performance tends to be inconsistent over time.

The disturbance of the minimal self may manifest in people in various ways, including as a tendency to inspect one's thoughts in order to know what they are thinking, like a person seeing an image, reading a message, or listening closely to someone talking (audible thoughts; or in German: Gedankenlautwerden). In normal thought, the "signifier" (the images or inner speech representing the thought) and the "meaning" are combined into the "expression", so that the person "inhabits" their thinking, or that both the signifier and the meaning implicitly come to mind together; the person does not need to reflect on their thoughts to understand what they are thinking. In people with self-disorder, however, it is frequently the case that many thoughts are experienced as more like external objects that are not implicitly comprehended. The person must turn their focus toward the thoughts to understand their thoughts because of that lack of implicit comprehension, a split of the signifier and the meaning from each other, where the signifier emerges automatically in the field of awareness but the meaning does not. This is an example of the failing "mine-ness" of the experiential field as the minimal self recedes from its own thoughts, which are consigned to an outer space. This is present chronically, both during and outside of psychosis, and may represent a middle point between normal inner speech and auditory hallucinations, as well as normal experience and first-rank symptoms.

They may also experience uncontrolled multiple trains of thought with different themes simultaneously coursing through one's head interfering with concentration (thought pressure) or often feel they must attend to things with their full attention in order to get done what most people can do without giving it much thought (hyper-reflectivity), which can lead to fatigue.

Examination of Anomalous Self-Experience (EASE) 
The EASE is a semi-structured interview that attempts to capture the extent of the mainly non-psychotic self-disorders experienced by the person. It is divided into 5 broad sections:

 Cognition and stream of consciousness, which covers disturbances in the flow of thoughts and experiences, and includes such self-disorders as "thought pressure", an experienced chaos of unrelated thoughts, "loss of thought ipseity", a sense as if the person does not own their thoughts (but not to the level of psychosis), and "spatialization of experience", which is where the person experiences their thoughts as if they occurred within a space.
 Self-awareness and presence, which deals with dissociative experiences of the self and world as well as a tendency toward intense reflection, in addition to a declining understanding of how to interact with others and the world called "perplexity" or "lack of natural evidence."
 Bodily experiences, which deals with alienating experiences of the body as well as with "mimetic experiences", the sense of a person that if they move, pseudo-movements of other, unrelated objects are experienced
 Demarcation/transitivism, which covers specific disturbances in the person's ego boundaries such as the person confusing their own thoughts, ideas, and feelings for that of their interlocutor.
 Existential reorientation, which refers to changes in the person's experience of the world that reflect the effect of self-disorders on the person's worldview.

A large number of these items have affinities with the basic symptoms.

The EASE, and pre-EASE studies attempting to assess basic self-disturbance, has been found in studies to discriminate between people on the schizophrenia spectrum, and those with psychotic bipolar disorder or borderline personality disorder. The EASE has been found to have good reliability, meaning that when 2 clinicians do the assessment, they draw roughly the same conclusions. The items on the EASE were compared against the accounted experiences of depersonalization disorder, finding many affinities, but also differences, reflecting namely the failing sense of "mine-ness" of the experiential world and a tendency to confuse the self with the world, others, or both.

EASE items

Examination of Anomalous World Experience (EAWE) 
The EAWE is the companion interview to the EASE that focuses on the person's experiences with the world, rather than with the self. There are 6 domains:

 Space and objects, which deals with the person's experience with space and physical objects, with disorders including hallucinations, distortions of spatial relationships, and experiences of seeing the same object in multiple ways at the same time (called "contamination" on the Rorschach test).
 Time and events, which deals with the person's experience with time, with disorders involving time speeding up or slowing down, time breaking up or becoming fragmented, and constant anticipation of something major about to happen.
 Other persons, which deals with the person's experience of other people, with disorders including disruptions of the sense of ego boundaries with other people, referential ideation based on actions or words by other people, and loss or lack of the ability to naturally understand social situations and social cues leading to attempts to compensate through increased focus or concentration,.
 Language, which deals with reduced fluency and disruption of prose in one's native language, distortions in the person's expression which causes others to misunderstand the person, problems with concrete and abstract concepts, and distraction by individual words and phrases leading to the person having difficulty following what they are reading or listening to.
 Atmosphere, which deals with the person's overall feeling-state of the world, with disorders including derealization (particularly The Truman Show-style derealization), objects no longer having normal meaning, hyper-awareness of things that normally stay in the background of awareness, apophanous mood, and a sense of radical changes in the very structure of the universe itself.
 Existential orientation, which deals with radical changes in a person's worldview, dealing with such things as rejecting society's conventions and rules, being extremely open to believing new ideas, and grandiosity which involves the person considering others to be inferior, like insects compared to them.

EAWE items 

*Indicates experience that can also occur in other primary psychotic or mood disorders outside the schizophrenia spectrum, such as delusional disorder, major depressive disorder, or bipolar disorder.

Clinical relevance 
The presence of self-disorders may have predictive power for whether those with an at risk mental state will develop psychosis; the risk of suicidal ideation and suicide by people with schizophrenia, though depression would also be an important factor; predicting initial social dysfunction in people with either schizophrenic or bipolar psychosis; and whether a person will move to a schizophrenia spectrum diagnosis later.

The presence of self-disorders may cause reduced person insight into their illness through the alteration of the basic structures of consciousness.

Self-disorders are difficult for the people experiencing them to articulate spontaneously; and are not well-known, by either the general public or professionals in the field. Because of this, people will often make vague, clichéd complaints that mimic the symptoms of other mental disorders, symptoms such as "fatigue" or "concentration difficulties". Were a knowledgeable clinician to probe deeper, however, the underlying self-disorders may be assessed and help clarify the nature of the person's illness. In their review, Parnas, et al. (2014) say, "The psychiatrist’s acquaintance with the phenomenon of 'non-specific specificity' is, in our view, extremely important in the context of early diagnostic assessment, especially of people presenting with a vague, unelaborated picture of maladjustment, underperformance, chronic malaise and dysphoria, negative symptoms, or hypochondriac preoccupations." People with schizophrenia often describe their self-disorders as causing more suffering for them than psychosis.

Self-disorders underlie most of the first-rank symptoms, those often termed passivity phenomena. There is a current proposal to list self-disorder as one of the symptoms of schizophrenia in the upcoming ICD-11.

Future directions and controversy 
In a 2014 review, Postmes, et al., suggested that self-disorders and psychosis may arise from attempts to compensate for perceptual incoherence and proposed a hypothesis for how the interaction among these phenomena and the person's attempts to resolve the incoherence give rise to schizophrenia. The problems with the integration of sensory information create problems for the person in keeping a grip on the world, and since the self-world interaction is fundamentally linked to the basic sense of self, the latter is also disrupted as a result. Sass and Borda have studied the correlates of the dimensions of self-disorders, namely disturbed grip (perplexity, difficulty "getting" stuff most people can get), hyperreflexivity (where thoughts, feelings, sensations, and objects pop up uncontrollably in the field of awareness, as well dysfunctional reflecting on matters and the self), and diminished self-affection (where the person has difficulty being "affected" by aspects of the self, experiencing those aspects as if they existed in an outer space), and have proposed how both primary and secondary factors may arise from dysfunctions in perceptual organization and multisensory integration.

In a 2013 review, Mishara, et al., criticized the concept of the minimal self as an explanation for self-disorder, saying that it is unfalsifiable, and that self-disorder arises primarily from difficulty integrating different aspects of the self as well as having difficulty distinguishing self and other, as proposed by Lysaker and Lysaker: Ichstörung or ego disorder, as they say, in schizophrenia arises from disturbed relationships not from the "solipsistic" concept of the self as proposed by Sass, Parnas, and others. In his review, Sass agrees that the focus of research into self-disorder has focused too much on the self, and mentions attempts to look at disturbances in the person's relationship with other people and the world, with work being done to create an Examination of Anomalous World Experience, which will look at the person's anomalous experiences regarding time, space, persons, language, and atmosphere; he suggests there are problems with both the self and the world in people with self-disorder, and that it may be better conceptualized as a "presence-disturbance". Parnas acknowledges the Lysaker model, but says that it is not incompatible with the concept of the minimal self, as they deal with different levels of self-hood.

History of the concept 

The concept of a basic self-disturbance in schizophrenia appears in all the foundational texts on the disease. However, the concept was difficult to operationalize and was criticized for being vague and too subjective; little systematic or empirical research was done on the concept in the 20th century. The publication of the DSM-III (1980) had unintended consequences, however, and led, in many instances, to focusing only on the signs and symptoms listed as criteria and generally ignoring the other signs and symptoms that can appear with each disorder; it privileged a behaviorist approach to diagnosis. The concept of this self-disturbance soon disappeared from training programs in the United States.

The Bonn Scale for the Assessment of Basic Symptoms was created to assess sub-clinical affective, cognitive and perceptual disturbances, as well as basic self-disturbance, in people, and in many studies basic symptoms were found to aggregate in people with schizophrenic and schizotypal disorders. Basic symptoms are subjective and difficult for the person to describe spontaneously, but the person will try to adapt and cope with them: functioning becomes impaired when people reach their adaptive capacity. In the period leading up to the first episode of schizophrenia, uncharacteristic basic symptoms first appear and are followed by the onset of more characteristic basic symptoms and, finally, psychosis.

To revive the concept of basic self-disturbance and to overcome the previous problems of a lack of a concrete definition of it, a group of researchers developed the EASE, based on phenomenological interviews with first-admission people with schizophrenia spectrum disorders, to enable empirical research of self-disorders.

See also 
 Schizotypy
 Early intervention in psychosis
 Center for Subjectivity Research

References

External links 

 Examination of Anomalous Self-Experience
 Center for Subjectivity Research

Schizophrenia
Symptoms
Phenomenology
Neuropsychology